Sahasam Swasaga Sagipo is a 2016 Indian Telugu-language romantic action thriller film written and directed by Gautham Vasudev Menon. It was produced by Miryala Ravinder Reddy, under Dwaraka Creations. The film stars Naga Chaitanya and Manjima Mohan. The plot follows a happy-go-lucky young man who is in love. However, in an unexpected turn of events, he and his dear ones are embroiled in a high-risk situation, which demands that he rise to the occasion and stand his ground against the odds. A Tamil version titled Achcham Yenbadhu Madamaiyada was simultaneously shot, with a different cast. The film features music composed by A. R. Rahman.

The film was released on 11 November 2016, two days after demonetisation, to mixed reviews from critics.

Plot
The reel opens with the snapshots of Rajinikanth Muralidhar (Naga Chaitanya) in a small brawl with a mob which later reveals that he had been quarrelling with the men for talking bad about his sister Maithrei.

Rajinikanth, who is hesitant to reveal his name, is an MBA student and bike enthusiast, accompanied by his close friends Mahesh, Shyam, Srikanth and auto driver Selvam. One evening Rajinikanth goes to a person who is torturing his sister to love him back, and a fight happens between them when Mahesh spends time with his girlfriend Divya in their area. Somehow all things falls, and a few days passed by, and Rajinikanth says that he is now confident to handle any situation that comes in his life, and he is ready to face them.

Rajinikanth is now grown up a little, and he has 2 love stories that revolved around him in the past, one is Sukanya, and another is Mallika, and now he considers his new Thunderbird bike as his first love ever. At this moment, he comes to meet Leela (Manjima Mohan), a friend of his sister Maithrei who stays in Rajinikanth's house to complete their course, and Rajinikanth falls in love with her, they both speak for a long time in their house day and night, and Rajinikanth narrates his love story with Leela with his friends daily.

Now Rajinikanth plans for a bike long trip to Kannyakumari along with his friend Mahesh, but eventually, he is accompanied by Leela instead of Mahesh, they go to Kannyakumari via Chennai, Salem and Trivandrum. On the trip, they go to a rural village and stay for a night where they are taking care of by a kind-hearted villager (Madurai Mohan). The next day they reach Kannyakumari and see the Sunrise, here Leela falls for Rajinikanth, and after the trip, Rajinikanth agrees to drop Leela to her home in Kolhapur. On the way to Maharastra in a busy highway, they meet with a terrible accident he injures and breaks his shoulder at the same day Leela's parents are attacked in Maharashtra.

They feel something was wrong, and that wasn't an accident. The same day, Leela's parents were injured, and her Father doesn't seem to get alive again. They come to know that it was a plan to kill Leela, now Rajinikanth comes to the hospital, and his friend Mahesh accompanies him, now enters a violent action space in Rajinikanth's life, and he decides to save Leela and her family.

However, things take a turn for the worse as they encounter something unexpected. The second half is a well furnished, racy, clearly dispenses the fearless-ness to destroy the corrupt Politician, Police Officer Kamat (Baba Sehgal) and a gangster Hiren (Daniel Balaji). Kamat is the one who does unwanted things to kill Raman and his wife. Also, Mahesh is killed in this process. Kamat now tries to trace out Rajinikanth even in Mahesh's funeral, and finally, he reaches Rajinikanth's house where he is revealed that he is Rajnikanth Muralidhar IPS, who attains his posting as the Deputy Commissioner of Police in the same Kolhapur, where Leela's parents were killed. Finally, he assassinates Kamat and goes on a trip to Kanyakumari again with Leela with a beautiful proposal.

Cast

 Naga Chaitanya as DCP Rajinikanth Nagarjuna Muralidhar IPS
 Manjima Mohan as Leela 
 Rakendu Mouli as Mahesh
 Baba Sehgal as Inspector Kamath
 Daniel Balaji as Hiren
 Anjali Rao as Maithrei
 Mathew Varghese as Muralidhar, Nagarjuna's father
 Sujata Panju as Nagarjuna's Mother
 Krrish as Atul
 Prasad Athalye as Dr. Yashwant Tripude
 Priya Rajkumar as Anamika
 Nagineedu as Sathyamoorthy
 Vasanthaa as Leela's mother
 Rishabh as Thambey
 Chalakudy Sunil as Maharashtra cop
 Vishwanath P U as Nathuram  Dubey
 K K Menon as Somnath Naik 
 Samragni as young Anamika
 R Shyam as Shyam
 Santosh Krishna as Srikanth
 R. S. Karthik as Auto Selvam
 R. N. R. Manohar as Mahesh's father
 Dollyann Santhosh as Sukanya
 Anandhi as Mallika
 Saran Bhaskar as Maithrei's stalker
 Shamhavy Gurumoorthy as Rajinkanth's younger sister
 Madurai Mohan as Villager
 Jaydev Subramaniam as Hospital receptionist
 Samson T Wilson as Hospital gangster
 Elyas Khan as Hospital gangster
 Chandrasekharan B as Doctor
 Sunitha Ojha as Nurse 
 Bullet Babu as Ambulance driver
 S Sayath as a Taxi driver
 Khaleel L as Maharashtra cop
 Anil Bala as Maharashtra cop
 Birlaa Bose as Chennai cop
 Prayas Mann as Maharashtra cop
 Sathish Krishnan a cameo appearance in Shokilla song 
 Gautham Vasudev Menon in a cameo appearance as Police Officer

Soundtrack

The soundtrack album consists of five songs composed by A. R. Rahman. His original compositions for the Tamil version were retained without any change in the Telugu version. The Telugu lyrics are penned by Ananta Sriram, Rakendu Mouli, Krishna Chaitanya, and Sreejo.

Release
Movie released on 11 November 2016.

Reception

Box office 
Sahasam Swasaga Sagipo collected a total gross of ₹3.90 Crores and a share of ₹2.04 Crores worldwide on the first day of its release, its business was affected by Govt's ban on notes with the denomination of Rs 500 and Rs 1,000.

In the first weekend movie collected a total gross of ₹10 Crores and share of ₹5.15 Crores worldwide, and at US box office movie collected a total gross of $235,048.

Critical reception 
The Times of India gave 3.5 out of 5 stars stating, "If you can survive an unusual narrative for a plot that will unfold only at the climax, Saahasam… could be a good pick. The story in itself is good, and the direction, cinematography and music add a great deal to it. It’s a movie you should watch for the feels".
Sangeetha Devi Dundoo of The Hindu 3.5 out of 5 stars stating "Sahasam Swasaga Sagipo is worth a watch for some terrific moments". 
Suhas Yellapantula of The New Indian Express 3 out of 5 stars stating "A love story-turned-suspense thriller has a bit of everything in it.".

Suresh Kavirayani of Deccan Chronicle 3 out of 5 stars stating "A perfect mixture of romance and action. Gautam showcases his skills once again with a mix of romance and action. From then on wards, the movie is a typical Gautam Menon thriller.".
IndiaGlitz 3 out of 5 stars stating "A shoot-out drama and a love story, 'SSS' comes with a narration that makes for a good watch.  It may not be gripping in the same degree throughout, but the believable stunts, characterizations, and the technical departments ensure you are not bored.".

Accolades

Filmfare Awards South
 Nominated - Best Music Director – Telugu - A. R. Rahman
 Nominated - Best Lyricist – Telugu - Anantha Sreeram – "Thaanu Nenu" 
 Nominated -  Best Male Playback Singer – Telugu - Vijay Prakash – "Thanu Nenu"

SIIMA Awards
 Nominated -  Best Male Playback Singer (Telugu) - Sid Sriram – "Vellipomakey"

Legacy 
The song "Vellipomakey" inspired a film of the same name starring Vishwak Sen.

References

External links
 

2016 films
Films directed by Gautham Vasudev Menon
Films scored by A. R. Rahman
Indian multilingual films
Indian road movies
Indian romantic action films
Indian action thriller films
2010s Telugu-language films
Indian romantic thriller films
2016 multilingual films
2016 action thriller films
2010s road movies
2010s romantic action films
2010s romantic thriller films
Indian drama road movies